Chebulagic acid is a benzopyran tannin and an antioxidant that has many potential uses in medicine.

It has been found to be immunosuppressive, hepatoprotective, and a potent alpha-glucosidase inhibitor, a human gut enzyme useful in diabetic studies.

It has been shown to be active against Staphylococcus aureus and Candida albicans.

It is found in the plants Terminalia chebula, T. citrina and  T. catappa.

It is formed from geraniin through a glutathione-mediated conversion.

References 

Phenol antioxidants
Ellagitannins